Raymond High School may refer to:

Raymond High School (Alberta), Canada
Raymond High School (Mississippi), United States
Raymond High School (New Hampshire), United States